The 1946 Sugar Bowl was the eleventh edition of the bowl game and matched the Oklahoma A&M Cowboys and the St. Mary's Gaels. It was played on Tuesday, January 1, 1946, at Tulane Stadium in New Orleans, 

The radio broadcast was carried by the ABC network.

Background
The undefeated Oklahoma A&M Aggies (later became Oklahoma State Cowboys) repeated as champions of the Missouri Valley Conference, and had won the previous year's Cotton Bowl. St. Mary's was a small independent from northern California that was making its second bowl appearance (1939 Cotton Bowl). The Gaels started the season  with notable wins over USC, California, and Nevada, before a loss to UCLA in the last game ending the unbeaten streak. Both teams were invited after  accepted the invitation to the Rose Bowl and undefeated Army continued their bowl abstinence.

The final AP poll was released in early December: Oklahoma A&M was fifth and St. Mary's was seventh.

Game summary
The Gaels were small compared to the Aggies, being undersized by at least  to a team that averaged  and that had war veterans such as Jim Reynolds and Burt Cole. But St. Mary's scored first on a Herman Wedemeyer touchdown pass to Denis O'Connor. Bob Fenimore responded with a touchdown pass to Cecil Haskins, and Fenimore scored on a touchdown run later in the half. Wedemeyer contributed to the Gaels' final touchdown as he lateraled to guard Carl DeSalvo, who ran 20 yards for a touchdown. But the kick failed, making it only  at halftime.

Fenimore and Reynolds added in touchdown runs in the second half as the lineman size started to make a difference, with St. Mary's four turnovers mattering more than Oklahoma A&M's. Joe Thomas caught a touchdown in the final five minutes to make the final score  as the Gaels were shut out in the second half, and the Cowboys won their second straight bowl game. Note: Denis O'Connor, St, Mary's QB also played both ways as did Wedemeyer and Fenimore, known as 60-Minute Men in the day.  O'Connor on defense is tied for Sugar Bowl interceptions with three.

Aftermath
After a Bowl appearance the following year in the Oil Bowl, played in Houston vs. Georgia Tech, the Gaels never qualified for a bowl game again, later playing in Division II and Division I-AA; the program was disbanded prior to the 2004 season.  O'Connor (1944) and Wedemeyer (1943) both played in the East West Shrine All Star game. The Cowboys did not return to the Sugar Bowl for seventy years, until January 2016.

Statistics

References

Sugar Bowl
Sugar Bowl
Oklahoma State Cowboys football bowl games
Saint Mary's Gaels football bowl games
Sugar Bowl
Sugar Bowl